WFND-LD (channel 19) is a low-power television station in Findlay, Ohio, United States, serving the Toledo area as a Buckeye Cable Sports Network affiliate owned by Block Communications. Its licensee is West Central Ohio Broadcasting, Inc., a Block subsidiary.  Block also owns several other assets in Northwestern Ohio, including The Blade, Buckeye CableSystem and WLIO. Engineering operations and monitoring are performed from West Central Ohio Broadcasting's operation center at 1424 Rice Avenue in Lima. The engineering supervisor is Frederick Vobbe.

The station transmitter is a Gates Air model ULXTE-4 with an Alive Telecomm ATC-BCE48C1R-U Elliptical polarized antenna, (transmitter output power of 1,740 watts), electrical beam tilt of 1 degree (R/C AGL: 86 m R/C AMSL: 331.3 m). The pattern is the same as WFND when on Channel 22.

History

In 2004, the station was acquired from low-power broadcasting giant Equity Broadcasting by Metro Video Productions of Lima. Five years later, the station was purchased by Block Communications of Toledo.

On January 8, 2013, the station made a flash cut to digital channel 22, and is operating with 15 kilowatts of power from a site located at 3800 North County Road 220 in Allen Township, north of the Whirlpool plant.

On June 11, 2018, the station completed its construction permit to move from channel 22 to channel 19. The programming for WFND is now the Buckeye Cable Sports Network in HD.

References

External links

Television stations in Ohio
Television channels and stations established in 1990
Low-power television stations in the United States